Events from the year 1787 in Scotland.

Incumbents

Law officers 
 Lord Advocate – Ilay Campbell
 Solicitor General for Scotland – Robert Dundas of Arniston

Judiciary 
 Lord President of the Court of Session – Lord Arniston, the younger until 13 December; then from 22 December, Lord Glenlee
 Lord Justice General – The Viscount Stormont
 Lord Justice Clerk – Lord Barskimming, then Lord Braxfield

Events 
 11 January – new Assembly Rooms opened in George Street, Edinburgh.
 27 January – Bridge of Dun completed.
 1 February – New Club, Edinburgh, founded as a private gentlemen's club.
 June
 Patrick Miller of Dalswinton demonstrates his design of manually-propelled paddleboat on the Firth of Forth.
 Kennetpans Distillery begins to operate a condensing rotative stationary steam engine designed by James Watt, the first in Scotland. 
 Summer – Calton Weavers Strike. On 3 September, six of the Calton weavers are killed by troops.
 1 December – Kinnaird Head Lighthouse first illuminated.
 Catrine is developed on the River Ayr around one of the first cotton mills in Scotland by Claud Alexander of Ballochmyle in partnership with David Dale.
 The Scotch Distilling Act imposes a tax on gin exported from Scotland to England.
 Kerelaw House and Tarbat House built.

Births 
 7 January – Patrick Nasmyth, landscape painter (died 1831 in London)
 11 February – Alexander Maconochie, naval officer, geographer and penal reformer (died 1860 in England)
 14 May – Alexander Laing, "the Brechin poet" (died 1857)
 22 November – Robert Balmer, minister of the Secession Church (died 1844)
 17 December – John Forbes, physician (died 1861 in England)
 Susanna Hawkins, poet (died 1868)
 Hugh Maxwell, lawyer and politician in New York (died 1873 in the United States)

Deaths 
 6 June – Robert Duff, naval officer (born c. 1721)
 19 June – John Brown, theologian (born 1722)
 5 September – John Brown, portrait-draftsman and painter in Edinburgh (born 1749)
 27 December – Thomas Hay, 9th Earl of Kinnoull, politician (born 1710)
 Lady Anne Farquharson-MacKintosh, Jacobite (born 1723)

The arts
 17 April – the Edinburgh edition of Robert Burns' Poems, Chiefly in the Scottish Dialect is published by William Creech including a portrait of Burns by Alexander Nasmyth. The poet has great social success in the city's literary circles; 16-year-old Walter Scott meets him at the house of Adam Ferguson. Burns also writes the first version of "The Battle of Sherramuir" this year.
 4 December – Burns meets Agnes Maclehose at a party given by Miss Erskine Nimmo.
 The Scots Musical Museum begins publication.

Sport 
 May – Glasgow Golf Club founded.

See also 

Timeline of Scottish history
 1787 in Great Britain

References 

 
Years of the 18th century in Scotland
Scotland
1780s in Scotland